Tak Baghestan (also Romanized as Tak Bāghestān) is a village in Banestan Rural District, in the Central District of Behabad County, Yazd Province, Iran. At the 2006 census, its population was 8, in 4 families.

References 

Populated places in Behabad County